A general election was held in the United Kingdom on Thursday 3 May 1979 and all 71 seats in Scotland were contested.

Background 

The 1979 Scottish devolution referendum, held on 1 March, had resulted a  majority of those voting casting their votes in favour of the creation of a Scottish Assembly, but the rules of the referendum required at least 40% of the total electorate supporting the proposal, a total which was not reached. The minority Labour government, knowing that many of its own MPs would rebel if they pressed on with the legislation to create the Assembly, refused demands from the Scottish National Party and Plaid Cymru to do so. On 28 March, the SNP joined the Conservatives, Liberals and others in supporting a motion of no confidence in the Government which passed by one vote, forcing a general election.

After the election, Anthony Finlay wrote in The Glasgow Herald that the SNP's support for the motion of no confidence "seemed an odd move at the time", but was based on the notion that Scottish electors would be so outraged at devolution not being enacted, despite winning the support of 52% who voted, that they would turn to the SNP in protest. As Finlay noted, the SNP's stance was to prove a "fundamental error of judgement". At an election rally in Glasgow at the start of the campaign, Callaghan attacked the SNP's role in joining with the Conservatives to bring his Government down. He  described them as "turkeys voting for Christmas" and urged his Scottish supporters to "carve them up in the polling booths."

At the end of April, an Opinion Research Centre opinion poll for The Scotsman  predicted Labour would win 42% of the votes in Scotland with the Conservatives winning 34%, the SNP 15% and the Liberal Party 8%.

MPs 
List of MPs for constituencies in Scotland (1979–1983)

Results

Votes summary

Incumbents defeated

Outcome 

Of the 11 SNP MPs elected at the previous election, seven were defeated by Conservatives and two by Labour candidates. The two survivoring SNP MPs were Gordon Wilson in Dundee East and Donald Stewart in the Western Isles. Wilson's survival was attributed by Anthony Finlay as being due to Labour's choice of Jimmy Reid as their candidate to oppose him. Labour also gained Glasgow Cathcart from the Conservative's Shadow Secretary of State for Scotland Teddy Taylor. Jim Sillars, a former Labour MP who had led the breakaway Scottish Labour Party lost his South Ayrshire seat to Labour's George Foulkes.

References 

1979 in Scotland
1970s elections in Scotland
1979
Scotland